In mathematics, a polynomial sequence  has a generalized Appell representation if the generating function for the polynomials takes on a certain form:

where the generating function or kernel  is composed of the series 

 with 

and 
 and all 

and
 with 

Given the above, it is not hard to show that  is a polynomial of degree .

Boas–Buck polynomials are a slightly more general class of polynomials.

Special cases
 The choice of  gives the class of Brenke polynomials.
 The choice of  results in the Sheffer sequence of polynomials, which include the general difference polynomials, such as the Newton polynomials.

Explicit representation
The generalized Appell polynomials have the explicit representation

The constant is

where this sum extends over all compositions of  into  parts; that is, the sum extends over all  such that

For the Appell polynomials, this becomes the formula

Recursion relation

where  and  have the power series

and 

Substituting 

immediately gives the recursion relation

See also

 q-difference polynomials

References
 Ralph P. Boas, Jr. and R. Creighton Buck, Polynomial Expansions of Analytic Functions (Second Printing Corrected), (1964) Academic Press Inc., Publishers New York, Springer-Verlag, Berlin. Library of Congress Card Number 63-23263.
 
 

Polynomials